4-Acetoxy-MET (4-Acetoxy-N-methyl-N-ethyltryptamine), also known as metacetin or 4-AcO-MET, is a hallucinogenic tryptamine. It is the acetate ester of 4-HO-MET, and a homologue of 4-AcO-DMT. It is a novel compound with very little history of human use. It is sometimes sold as a research chemical by online retailers.  

It is expected that the compound is quickly hydrolyzed into the free phenolic 4-HO-MET by serum esterases, but human studies concerning the metabolic fate of this drug are lacking.

Legality 
4-Acetoxy-MET is unscheduled in the United States. It may be considered an analogue of Psilocin, a Schedule I drug under the Controlled Substances Act. As such, the sale for human consumption or the use for illicit non-medical purposes could be considered a crime under the Federal Analogue Act

4-Acetoxy-MET is a controlled substance in Switzerland under Verzeichnis E 

4-Acetoxy-MET is a Class A drug in the UK because it is an ester of the drug 4-HO-MET, which is a Class A drug under the tryptamine catch-all clause

References 

Psychedelic tryptamines
Designer drugs
Acetate esters

pl:4-Acetoksy-N,N-dietylotryptamina
sv:4-acetoxy-DET